HMS P36 was a British U class submarine, a member of the third group of that class to be built. She was sunk at the quayside in Malta in 1942, and some of her survivors were shipwrecked again in another submarine less than six weeks later.

Service history
On 26 November 1941 on patrol in the Bay of Biscay, P36 attacked a German submarine with torpedoes south-west of Belle-Ile island. The torpedoes missed their target which may have been one of U-133, U-552, U-567 or U-577.

None of the torpedoes hit.

On 1 April 1942 P36 was lying alongside a jetty at Sliema Harbour in Malta when the Luftwaffe attacked the harbour. A large bomb from a Sturzkampfgeschwader 3 aircraft landed sufficiently near to the submarine to hole her and she began to sink. Despite desperate efforts to save the submarine she rolled over and sank. She was not raised until 7 August 1958 and then scuttled off Malta on 22 August 1958. Following the loss of P36 in 1942, some surviving crew members embarked on board another submarine HMS Olympus bound for Gibraltar. Shortly after leaving Malta on 8 May 1942, Olympus struck a mine and sank. The nine survivors of the 98 passengers and crew swam  back to the Maltese coast.

References 
Notes

Bibliography
 
 

 

British U-class submarines
Ships built in Barrow-in-Furness
1941 ships
World War II submarines of the United Kingdom
Submarines sunk by aircraft
Lost submarines of the United Kingdom
World War II shipwrecks in the Mediterranean Sea
Maritime incidents in April 1942
Ships sunk by German aircraft